Maduru is a village in Thonduru Mandal, Kadapa district  in the Indian state of Andhra Pradesh. As of 2011, the village has a population of 1,349.

References 

Villages in Kadapa district